The Australian Counselling Association (ACA) is a non-profit, professional organisation that is dedicated to the counselling profession. ACA represents over 11,000 Registered Counsellors and Psychotherapists in Australia. ACA is the largest peak body for counselling and psychotherapy in Australia.

Mission 
The mission of the Australian Counselling Association is to enhance the quality of life in society by promoting the development of professional counsellors, advancing the counselling and psychotherapy profession, and using the profession and practice of counselling to promote respect for human dignity and diversity.

Government accreditation
The counselling profession in Australia is currently not government regulated. Therefore, clients are faced with the task of evaluating qualifications of various counsellors and psychotherapists. ACA is one of two industry associations (with PACFA) that is campaigning for government accreditation of counselling in Australia. As of 2010, none of the federal or state jurisdictions are actively considering regulation of the counselling profession.

See also 
Psychotherapy and Counselling Federation of Australia

References

External links 
Australian Counselling Association
Counselling Tutor

Professional associations based in Australia
Mental health organisations in Australia